The history of Union Sportive Médina d'Alger between 1937 and 2010, commonly referred to as USM Alger or simply USMA, is an Algerian professional association football club based in Algiers, whose first team play in the highest tier of Algerian football, the Ligue 1. Established on 5 July 1937. He won the first trophy in 1963 against MC Alger and reached the final of the cup. 17 time, a record, including five consecutive times from 1969 to 1973 and won eight first time in 1981 against ASM Oran and last against MC Alger in 2013 also made the USMA Super Cup twice either on the level of the Continental USM Alger did not achieve any title and the best result is the 2015 CAF Champions League Final The team landed to the second division of several times the first from 1965 to 1969 and, latest of which, the longest from 1990 to 1995.

Early years
In July 1935, Omar Aichoun and Mustapha Kaoui, both merchants of jute bags, decided to create an exclusively Muslim sports association in which no European would appear. At the time, the National Movement, led by Étoile Nord-Africaine of Emir Khalid ibn Hashim, grandson of Emir Abdelkader, ran out of steam while the creation of the PPA (Parti Politique Algérien), spiritual father, was organized. of the FLN, Aichoun and Kaoui, join the popular effervescence. They frequent the activists of the National Movement, many in the district of the Casbah and hear about the need to create sports clubs, the ideal framework to bring together Algerian youth. The increasingly seasoned national movement is pushing for the creation of sports associations.

During the year 1935, the two men will multiply contacts, helped by Arezki Meddad, father of the future chahida Ourida Meddad. Their choice falls on Ali Lahmar, said Ali Zaid, future chahid of the liberation war and Sid Ahmed Kemmat. These men formed the first office of USMA, an office chaired by Ali Zaid, the honorary presidency going to Omar Aichoun and Arezki Meddad. In addition to their nationalist and sporting activities, Omar Aichoun and Mustapha Kaoui also frequent the Nadi Ettaraki (Circle of progress), an association created under the so-called 1901 law. Its head office is at « 9, place du Gouvernement » (Today). Place des Martyrs), in Algiers, The circle of progress is managed by the Islamic Reform Movement (El Islah), led by Sheikh Tayeb El Okbi, whose son Djamel will later be USM Alger goalkeeper. Fearing that the practice of sport is incompatible with the precepts of Islam, those concerned seek advice from the Sheikh, who encourages them and offers his blessing to USMA. For the administrative procedures and in order to obtain the agreement of the colonial authorities, they request the statutes from the Secretary General of MC Alger who willingly gives him a copy.

The USMA option having been successful, the PPA renewed the operation and thus Union Sportive Musulmane, Espérance Sportives Musulmane, Jeunesse Sportive Musulmane, Widad and Croissant club were born. They were everywhere these clubs which were schools of Nationalism and Patriotism. Union Sportive Musulmane Algéroise was therefore born, and was ready to participate in 1938 in the 3rd division championship. At that time many players had expressed the wish to come to this club, unfortunately the regulations (license B) prohibited them. In addition, all participating clubs had to have a stadium for the competition. A criterion for which the federation of the time was uncompromising. This is what Mr. Kemmat did in the face of these two problems: “USM Alger at the time required a contract with a stadium for a minimum period of five years. This is to ensure the running of the competitions. I had contacted the leaders of the O club. Pointe Pescade (current Raïs Hamidou) and we had come to an understanding by paying him five thousand francs annually. For the money, no need to tell you where it came from ”, he adds with a sigh which speaks volumes about the state of mind that reigned at that time. The first official match was on October 17, 1937 against JSO Hussein Dey and it ended in a draw.

Through World War II

In the 1939–40 season USM Alger played for the first time in the first division and because of the outbreak of the World War II the championship was divided into three groups where USM Alger signed in the group A the team was bad where they won only two games against the same team US Alger and they was defeated in 9 games where USM Alger could not face the big teams then like RU Alger and AS Saint Eugène in the end, finished second to last either in Coupe de la Ligue and Coupe de la Solidarité the journey ended in the first round against US Blida and Stade Algérois respectively. On April 2, 1942, the Board of Directors announced the death of the club's president Arezki Meddad. The resumption of official competitions occur in 1942. For the 1942–43 season, USMA returns to the third division according to the regulations in force. Mr El-Hadj Ahmed Kemmat intervenes: 

However, at the end of this season, USMA reached the second division with Mustapha El-Kamal as coach. The headquarters are now rue de Bône and the USMA has meanwhile opened its doors to other sports sections such as boxing, basketball and cycling. The activities continue their little way thanks to the dedication of Amrani Abdelkader, Abdelhamid Mohamed and Cherchari Abdelkader, the main leaders of these new disciplines. Its border location between the towns of Bologhine (Ex Saint Eugene) and Bab El Oued, gives it the advantage to dominate a beautiful bay dominated by the promontory of Z'ghara district and the Basilica of Our Lady of Africa. This town which was very popular for its beauty, from the Ottoman period, and where were localized deys summer residences and some diplomatic representations, such as consulates of France, Belgium, England and the United States, passed to the rank common in colonial times and as of September 14, 1870 where she was baptized under the name of St. Eugene in honor of Eugene account Guyot, civilian director of Algiers from 1839 to 1844 and also gave its name City Guyotville (now Ain Benian). After the massacres of May 8, 1945 in Setif, Guelma and Kherrata USM Alger administration decided to change the Maroon color to the black in mourning for the lives of the victims to become the club's colors red and black. 45,000 Algerian demonstrators came out to celebrate the end of hostilities in World War II that day, recalling the colonial forces their patriotic claims. But the bloody repression of the French army found no other way to meet their legitimate demands that cause genocide. To show their patriotic commitment and sympathy, The black is synonymous with grief and they have changed Maroon to red which represents the blood of martyrs who fell that day.

Instability of results (1950–56)
USM Alger in 1950 was promoted to the First division with the Krimo brothers, the Azzouz brothers, Chabli, Benhaik and that was at the same time one day before the period of the great break towards Hammam-Lif, also they Change the club headquarters from rue du Divan (behind Ketchaoua Mosque) to rue de Bône and at the same time USM Alger opened its doors to other sports divisions such as boxing, basketball and cycling. Activities continue on their way thanks to the dedication of Abdelkader Omrani, Mohamed Abdelhamid and Abdelkader Cherchari, the main leaders of these new disciplines. Mr.Kemmat would like to remind us of this Abdelkader Cherchari who was the head of the cycling department has donated one of the three pieces that the USM used as a seat. Examples of this kind, each given according to his means, a school where the youth took as a model for all these men who were born Here, it's up to Ali Zammouri, one of those who was part of the founding group, had the particularity of taking care of patching all his football boots at the end of each season and at his own expense. The 1951–52 season witnessed the joining of Abdelhamid Kermali to the club coming from USM Sétif and after only one season, Kermali moved to France to play with FC Mulhouse. after which he wrote his name who went in the history of Algerian football that is led the Algerian national team to the first African Cup of Nations in 1990.

USM Alger and National Liberation War (1956–62)

In 1956, the central management of the FLN decided to cease all sporting activities of Muslim clubs. A meeting was held at the USMA circle on Rue de Bône to decide on the cessation of football. It was held under the chairmanship of Ali Cherifi, vice-president of USMA and responsible for finances of Zone autonome d'Alger (ZAA). Two of the first officials of Zone autonome d'Alger (ZAA) were then part of USMA, It is noteworthy that Muhammad Hattab better known as Habib Reda, who led the bomb network within the autonomous region and was sentenced to death was a basketball player in USM Alger, Furthermore it should be added that the colonial authorities after noting that the circle of USMA, located at 7 rue de Bône, served as a refuge for the fidayins in particular after the Casbah was closed by a network of barbed wire leaving only a few passages monitored and controlled, had the circle occupied by the Zouaves in November 1956, then by the paratroopers who made it a center of torture. All the administrative and technical archives of USM Alger were seized by the occupying army. and in the 1955–56 season, the USM Alger participated in the second division in groupe III, the last season before the independence of Algeria, where on March 4, 1956 in the 16th round against AS Rivet and two games before the end of the season USM Alger withdrew from the tournament, the League of Algiers office registered the packages of many Muslim clubs following the events that occurred at the match between the MC Alger and AS Saint Eugène. In Promotion Honneur, RC Kouba, USM Marengo, WR Belcourt, JS Kabylie, JS El Biar and OM Saint Eugène declared general forfeiture on 11 March 1956. 

Given the exceptional circumstances and circumstances The league still decided to put them in the final standings in order not to penalize them (because normally the rule stipulates it is a downgrading in lower division for any general package), with a view to of a possible resumption of their activities for the next season. this withdrawal i come at the request of the National Liberation Front (FLN) in support of the revolution against French colonialism and the delivery of voice to the world after the withdrawal, he joined a number of the squad to the front in the mountains. Reacting to this refusal of the old Algiers club, ZAA officials appointed two fidayînes responsible for creating disorder during the AS Saint Eugène / MC Alger match at the Saint Eugène stadium in order to push the MCA to cease activities. These two martyrs are two USMA players Boudissa Abdelkader known as "Chichois", fallen in the field of honor in Wilaya IV and Ferhaoui Rachid known as “Rachid Red” sentenced to death in 1957. The sacrifice of the Red and black will not stop there, since the club of Soustara will give the largest number of Chahids (martyrs) to the revolution among football clubs, and this number rises to 42 including two heads of regions, Captain Allel Oukid head of the 4th region of Wilaya IV and Bennacer Mohamed Arezki, head of the 3rd region of the ZAA and head of the bomb network.

After independence

Algeria's first champion 

football competitions come to life in the country. Given the geographical distribution of the clubs throughout the country, formerly divided into three departments under the French colonial administration, each league took over the organization of the competitions in an autonomous way, encouraged by the Ministry of Sports and Youth. In the early years, the competitions thus restarted in the form of regional criteria at the end of which were sacred the departmental champions who were then to compete in the form of tournaments "play off" to designate the Champion of Algeria. League beginning with the first post-independence the USM Alger administration to bring the former Nice and Monaco player Abdelaziz Ben Tifour to be a coach and a player at the same time, also included one foreign player Freddy Zemmour from Pied-Noir one of the few French players who have decided to stay in Algeria. USM Alger took place in Group V and took first place with 51 points and strongest offensive line in each league with 75 goal after the piece and in Algiers League in a group with MC Alger, AS Orléansville, NA Hussein Dey and OM Saint Eugène took first place also with 12 points from 12 to advance to the semi-finals and play against Hamra Annaba previously USM Annaba and won to qualify for the final of the first tournament in the history of Algeria, and find MC Alger again The Red and Black, led by player-coach Bentifour easily outweigh the score of 3–0 in a match played at the Stade d'El Annasser, in the presence of President Ahmed Ben Bella and Minister of Defense Houari Boumedienne. From here Sostara was honored to be the first club to win the championship title in the era of independence.

either in Algerian Cup USMA eliminated from semi-final against ES Setif and defeated, in the next season USMA finished third, one point behind champion for Algérois group NA Hussein Dey either in the Cup and the team arrived in the semi-final against the same team ES Setif, in the 1964–65 season the team fell to the second division and finished in last place, either in the Cup stopped the march in the second round against NA Hussein Dey. In their first season in the Division Honneur team finished second behind champion MC Alger difference of 7 points to ascend together to Nationale II 1966–67 in the new version, with ten clubs the next season USMA failed to return to the first division and finished fifth and the top scorer with 8 goals Meziani, in either competition Cup team reached the semi-finals and was defeated again against ES Setif 1–3 aggregate This is the third time excludes USMA at the hands of ES Setif in the semi-finals, in the 1967–68 season after the USM Alger attempts to climb continued but failed again and finished fifth, 4 points for second promoted JS Djijel and again Meziani is the top scorer, and finally in the 1968–69 season the USMA was able to return to Nationale I after four seasons in the lower grades and occupied second place behind champion JS Kabylie and celebrations continued arrival of the team for the first time to Algerian cup final However, were defeated against the National champion CR Belcourt by score 3–5 after replay the match.

Five consecutive finals in the Algerian Cup

In the late sixties and seventies USM Alger arrived seven times to the Algerian Cup final including five consecutive, before that USM Alger was eliminated three times in the semi-finals and against the same club ES Sétif, first final was in 1969 The journey was balanced, and in the quarter and semi-finals, USM Alger met in the derby against RC Kouba and NA Hussein Dey and won a goal in both of them to reach the final to face CR Belcourt who is the champion of Algeria at the same time and lose 5–3 in a rematch, including the first hat-trick in the Algerian Cup final scored by Hacène Lalmas. Despite that, USM Alger was included in participating in the Maghreb Cup Winners Cup as runner-up of the Algerian Cup, that took place in Morocco where USM Alger reached the final and was defeated against RS Settat the champion of Coupe du Trône. In the next final against the same club CR Belcourt was defeated, for the second time in a row after a draw The match was replayed and ending in a 4–1 defeat. Despite that USM Alger again participated in the Maghreb Cup Winners Cup as a runner-up of the Algerian Cup, finished in the last place with two defeats against Club Africain and Wydad Casablanca. 

In 1971 after a long march due to playing the quarter and semi-finals in home and away system Al-Ittihad reached the final to face in the Algiers Derby, MC Alger and be defeated again. before her in the semi-finals in Khenchela against the local team, Al-Ittihad was not welcomed because of a word used by USM Alger supporters which is that Khenchela is “Shawiya” a term that has been misinterpreted and they prepared a hostile reception and the match last, d four hours due to the storming to the stadium several times by the supporters. After the end of the match USM Alger players who were accompanied by a handful of fans, remained locked in the dressing rooms until midnight and after the intervention of a Gendarmerie brigade sent from Batna. his return to Algiers was around 9 am the next day, then the Algerian Football Federation at that time punished the two clubs by playing 50 kilometers away from its stadium for one year. As for USM Alger it received in the 1971–72 season at Stade des Frères Brakni. In 1972 the journey to the final was not easy, with a goal difference in three out of four matches to face Hamra Annaba in the opening of the new stadium Stade du 5 Juillet by President Houari Boumédiène and it ended in loss, Prior to this and in the youth final against RC Kouba, Nacer Guedioura became the first to score a goal in the new stadium to lead them to win the cup, The club was deprived of the services of Kamel Tchalabi who played the military final and despite they promise him to play if he participated in one half and scored, but he was prevented from participating. The last Algerian Cup final was against neighbors MC Alger, and ended with the fifth defeat in a row.

First professional era (1977–1989)

Change the name & first Algerian cup 

Also in the same period, the results of USM Alger in the Division 1 were not good, where USM Alger was the best ranked is fourth in the 1975–76 season, which saw the heaviest victory in the history of the Algerian League registered the name of the USM Alger, increasing the lead 11–0 against ASM Oran in Stade du 5 Juillet including five goals by Djamel Zidane, Also in the last round and in the same stadium  witnessed another big victory against USM Bel Abbès with eight including two hat-tricks from Zitoun and Amenouche. The seventies it's saw instability at the managers level including Ahmed Zitoun, Abdelghani Zitouni, Hamid Belamine and Ahmed Arab each one in two periods, USK Alger also fell to the second division for two seasons from 1972 to 1974, towards the end of 1974, a sports reform was carried out as intended by the Ministry of Youth and Sports, in order to give the elite clubs a good financial base allowing them to structure themselves professionally (in ASP Which means Association Sportive de Performances). The aim was therefore that they should have full management autonomy with the creation of their own training center. For this, many clubs had to sacrifice their names and rename them according to the main sponsor. In some club names, the letter P of the oil tankers of Sonatrach was shown to sponsor MC Alger, MC Oran and ES Sétif, renamed MP Alger, MP Oran and EP Sétif. and during the 1977–78 season, the team changed its name, to be named this time Union sportive kahraba d'Alger meaning electricity who had inherited the Société nationale de l'électricité et du gaz company (Sonelgaz).

After seven finals, El Kahraba was able to achieve first Cup title 1980–81 season against ASM Oran coached by Ali Benfadah in the new stadium Stade 24 Fevrier 1956, becoming the first club to win the Algerian Cup title from the second division, USM Alger some officials and supporters believe that the reason for the losses of the previous finals is the President of Algeria Houari Boumédiène who had a great hostility to the president who preceded him Ahmed Ben Bella who is known as a great fan of USM Alger and  they say why after his death they achieved the Algerian Cup title after seven defeats including five in a row, After achieving Ascension the first game of the season was in the Super Cup, in the first version at Stade du 20 Août 1955, against RC Kouba last season champions and ended with a loss. USM Alger finished the season in ninth place and in monitoring the first post in a continental competition of the African Cup Winners Cup USMA reached the quarter-finals and eliminated in front of Hearts of Oak, in 1987 the club name was changed again to Union d'Alger until 1989, faced with a major financial and economic crisis, the Algerian government in place in 1989 decides to abandon the 1977 reform. Most clubs thus reconnect with their original names  where change of a new name for the last time to Union sportive de la médina d'Alger meaning city.

Second cup & fall to the second division 

On July 5, 1987 USK Alger celebrated its 50th anniversary and the opportunity to bring everyone together has not been seized. Many of these people did not participate in this celebration. From the founding father Sid Ahmed Kemmat to the sympathetic son like Boualem Rahma the Chaabi singer, However they forgot many faces that presented to the club that the reasons the party was not complete. After that the USM Alger's results fluctuated between ups and downs for a decade and in spite of that and in the 1987–88 season the club returned to the first division with a young squad, mostly from Reserve team under the leadership of coach and former captain of the team Djamel Keddou, and despite the lack of experience, USM Alger managed to win the Algerian Cup for the second time after winning against CR Belouizdad with penalties at Stade 5 Juillet 1962 which is the fourth final between the two teams and the first victory for USMA after three defeats, after the match Amar Kabrane was subjected to great criticism and was accused of deliberately wasting the penalty shootout, especially since he then moved to them, USM Alger guarantee the qualification card for the African Cup Winners Cup for the second time, where USMA reached the quarter-finals and after the defeat in Algeria against the Malagasy club Football Club Banky they decided not to complete the competition for financial reasons. 1989–90 season was falling to the second division, and the USMA finished in last place with the weakest line of defense.

After the fall USM Alger was looking for a quick return to the first division, but it failed to achieve it. As for the Algerian Cup USMA reached the quarter-finals and eliminated against USM Bel Abbès and at the end of the season, the club's top scorer Tarek Hadj Adlane left for JS Kabylie. USMA suffered during this period of stability at the administrative level, as the chair of the Board of Directors witnessed a change three times, each of Saïd Hammo, Rachid Khelouati and Mouldi Aïssaoui the latter was also president of the Algerian Football Federation and Algeria witnessed a great political and economic crisis and the beginning of the black decade greatly affected the club's future. Also at the level of managers witnessed instability and the position of the coach was traded in a large number during this period including the Soviet Acramov. In the 1992–93 season, the club trained by four coaches at the same time including Allik and Aïssaoui which has not happened in its history. In the following season USMA competed strongly for the ticket to the first division to the last round and with a difference in direct confrontations with ASO Chlef it failed to achieve its goal.

Saïd Allik Era (1994–2010)

Back in the top flight and win the title after 33 years

In 1994 Saïd Allik became Chairman of the Board of Directors of USM Alger and promised to return the team to Division 1, On May 26, 1995 USM Alger won away from home against MC Ouargla and achieved an promotion challenge back to the Division 1 after five full seasons under the leadership of Younes Ifticène, Allik announce that USM Alger has returned to its normal place and will not fall again to the second division, In 1995–96 season Ifticen left USM Alger despite achieving the underlined goal to be replaced by Nour Benzekri Who withdrew in the middle of the season due to his disagreement with Azzedine Rahim, the latter was seriously injured after a violent intervention from Tarek Lazizi and due to the seriousness of the injury Rahim was transferred for treatment to Salt Lake City, United States and stayed there for a long time, Despite that Rahim continued to suffer until he finished his career early. In Algiers Derby who played in Omar Hamadi Stadium and after USM Alger scored a goal, the assistant referee was injured by smoke gases, to stop and be repeated behind closed doors in the same stadium. After that it was decided that the Algiers Derby would not be played in the future in this stadium with the presence of the fans. After a great struggle with MC Oran for the title and in the last round USM Alger won the title after its victory against CS Constantine at Stade Mohamed Hamlaoui, with a difference of only two points, it is the first in 33 years and the second in its history.

In the following season saw the return of Tarek Hadj Adlane after five years and the contract with African champion Mahieddine Meftah and because of it a great enmity began between Allik and Mohand Chérif Hannachi, USM Alger was unable to retain its title, and in the last match against CS Constantine it happened unlike last season, where this time CS Constantine need to win to achieve the title which was happened, twenty-four years after Tahar Chérif El-Ouazzani stated that they were deprived of two championship titles because of USM Alger. in 1997 CAF Champions League USMA participated for the first time a new copy of the competition, Where they reached the group stage in the last match against Primeiro de Agosto, USM Alger won with a single goal that was not enough to qualify for the final after a major conflict with Moroccan club Raja Casablanca Which at the same time in South Africa scored the winning goal in the last minute and qualified for the final. In 1997–98 season Algerian Football Federation change league system to the groups USMA signed in the group B with strong teams such as ES Setif, JS Kabylie and MC Alger side managed to qualify for the final 3 points for JS Kabylie Then in the final against USM El Harrach at Stade du 5 Juillet 1962 USM Alger lost the title, after he advanced (2–0) 20 minutes before the end of a match to receive a full team of three goals, in the final minute USMA to get a Penalty kick it is lost by defender Mounir Zeghdoud, Younes Ifticène was held responsible for replacing the scorers for the two goals. In 1998, Bologhine stadium was renamed Omar Hamadi, a former leader of the club and revolutionary (he was sentenced to death during his country's war of independence) and who was tragically killed along with his two son at Bouzareah (Algiers) by a terrorist group in 1995.

In the CAF Cup in 1999, USM Alger arrived to the quarter-finals and eliminated against Wydad Casablanca in either National 1 1999–2000 season was the worst season since the rise of the Red and Black and finished in last place and Rabah Saâdane was dismissed from his position as coach after he had failed to achieve what was required in all competitions but in this season, there was no fall to the second division, Saïd Allik stated that it is an opportunity to inject new life into the team in order to gain control of Algerian football and to sign with several stars such as Hichem Mezaïr, Moncef Ouichaoui and Issaad Bourahli with the rise of a number of young players, also USM Alger disqualified in 2000 African Cup Winners' Cup to be punished not to participate in any African competition for one year because of the participation an ineligible of goalkeeper Burkinabé Siaka Coulibaly against JS du Ténéré. in the Algerian League Cup arrived to the semi-final round and lost to CR Belouizdad, either in the African Cup Winners Cup in 2002, USM Alger achieved a post good and arrived in the semi-final and once again defeated against Wydad Casablanca and depriving them of their first continental title.

Division 1 Runners-up and three Cups

From 1996 to 2001, Les Usmistes did not succeed in the league too. A period of drought had just won, leaving the club just the honorary title of vice-champion in 1998 and 2001. However, the data are different in Algerian Cup because the club has expanded its list with three other Algerian Cup first in 1997 in the Round of 16 in a match that was expected against CS Constantine, but CSC withdrew and did not come to the stadium Where were they accused of collusion in order for USMA to facilitate its mission in the last round match of the National 1, then the road was not easy to reach the final where faced CA Batna and won by Tarek Ghoul goal, but this victory was without joy because of what happened after the end of the game in the middle of the black decade On a Eid al-Fitr, three USMA supporters who were celebrating the Algerian Cup won by their team are murdered in a false dam at Frais Vallon. 

in 1999 against JS Kabylie, the two teams met for the first time in the final of the Algerian Cup at Stade 5 Juillet 1962 and in the first final to be attended by the new president of the country Abdelaziz Bouteflika and the honorary president of the club Saadi Yacef and ended with the victory of USM Alger with two goals scored by Billel Dziri and the former player in JS Kabylie Tarek Hadj Adlane To be the fourth Cup of USMA, Before that in the Semi-finals against MC Alger, there was a great controversy over the way the game was played, where it was supposed to play from two games, but the Ministry of Youth and Sports decided to play the two games in Stade du 5 Juillet, Saïd Allik President of USMA, refused this insisting that each team plays in his stadium and Stade du 5 Juillet, he was the official stadium of MC Alger, after which the Minister of Youth and Sports Mohamed Aziz Derouaz rejected this request and insisted that he play on Stade du 5 Juillet for security reasons. On the day of the match, USM Alger went to Omar Hamadi Stadium and MC Alger and the referees to Stade du 5 Juillet. Minister of the Interior and Local Authorities at that time Abdelmalek Sellal called Allik to find a solution to this problem, His response was that there were two solutions the first is that each team plays in its stadium Or hold one game in a neutral stadium, and Allik proposes Stade du 19 Mai 1956 in Annaba, but because of the black decade and since both of them are from the capital, it was decided to hold it in Stade du 5 Juillet.

The third cup in 2001, in the Semi-finals against JSM Skikda at Stade 20 Août 1955, the match is stopped in the 46th minute due to the invasion of the field by JSM Skikda supporters Where was advanced with the goal of Azzedine Rahim, After pressure from the country's higher authorities, Saïd Allik accepted the replay of the match, later the FAF decided to repeat the match in a neutral stadium at Stade des Frères Brakni and ended with a 3–0 victory. In the final facing CRB Mécheria from second division which is up for the first time to the final. the only goal of the game was scored by Hocine Achiou to achieve the fifth title, The match was almost postponed by stopping for more than ten minutes due to a power outage at the beginning of the first half.

Winning the first double

In 2002–03 It was the best season in the history of USM Alger and participated in five competitions, The opening season was in the Arab Unified Club Championship, and was eliminated in the group stage, In the Cup Winners' Cup, the red and black reached the semi-finals, and was eliminated against Wydad Casablanca and fails to achieve the first continental title despite the second leg that took place in Algeria Where did USM Alger need to win to qualify for the final. In the Division 1, the journey towards achieving the title was not easy, and the struggle was great with USM Blida, NA Hussein Dey and JS Kabylie, and USM Alger waited until the 28 round to celebrate the title after winning against ASM Oran. On February 24, 2003, in the derby meeting against CR Belouizdad and in the last minutes while Hichem Mezaïr was heading to fetch the ball, the ball holder attacked him to respond in kind, so the match stopped and the stands turned into an arena of violence between the managers and supporters of the two clubs and despite that, the match was completed with difficulty. To complete the joy in the Algerian Cup by winning the title after the victory against CR Belouizdad after Moncef Ouichaoui scored the golden goal to achieve the double for the first time in its history under the leadership of Azzedine Aït Djoudi. also achieved Ouichaoui top scorer in the league for the first time a player from USM Alger with 18 goals including two hat-tricks, At the end of 2003 Amar Ammour won the Ballon d'or organized by El Heddaf-Le Buteur newspaper, with a big difference from his former club teammate Isâad Bourahli and Brahim Hemdani, by the presence of the Minister of Youth and Sports Boudjemaâ Haïchour, the President of the Algerian Olympic Committee Mustapha Berraf and the President of the Algerian Football Federation Mohamed Raouraoua in its third edition.

In the following season, USMA focused on achieving a great participation in the CAF Champions League after six years of absence and achieved a historic qualification to the semi-finals for the first time Where faced Enyimba and defeated 3–2 on aggregate, in the next edition of the same competition Mali's Mamadou Diallo won the top scorer with 10 goals for the first time player from an Algerian club Then Diallo moved to FC Nantes for 700,000 euros. the seventh Algerian Cup was won in 2004 against JS Kabylie where USM Alger won by penalties. And since everything has an end, 2004–05 was for Usmistes the end of an era that has long been dreaming all lovers of the club. The fifth league title was won under the leadership of Mustapha Aksouh it is the last title for Saïd Allik as a president. In the last round, the struggle for survival was between CR Belouizdad and OMR El Annasser although USM Alger does not need to win, it crushed OMR El Annasser with a four, all scored by Michael Eneramo to be the youngest player to score a hat-trick in USM Alger's first team, at 19 years old. The reason why Al Ittihad played with such strength goes back to the 1993–94 season in second division, when the struggle for promoted was between ASO Chlef and USM Alger, and in the last round ASO Chlef won against OMR El Annasser it took place at Stade 20 Août 1955 and USM Alger accused them of facilitating their mission, to go up to the first division by direct match difference. In 2005 Billel Dziri won the Ballon d'or as the second player from USMA to achieve it, He said I was expecting an individual crown and now that I have it I can only say my immense joy and that the award was the fruit of the efforts Dziri made for years in Algeria or outside the country, The award was received from the hand of the World Cup champion the former French star Laurent Blanc also with a message from Zinedine Zidane.

From 2005 to 2010, the worst of Saïd Allik's period, where the team's level declined and did not achieve any title and contented itself with playing the cup final twice against traditional rivals MC Alger and was defeated in both of them, their first final defeat since 1980. His level in Africa also declined, and after that USM Alger could not qualify, contenting himself to participate in the Arab Champions League only, Al-Ittihad Most of its players retired or getting old. and continued to rely on them for more than a decade It is said that the biggest reason for this decline is the support of Saïd Allik for Ali Benflis in the presidential election against President Abdelaziz Bouteflika at the time, In the 2005–06 season USM Alger finished runners-up behind champion JS Kabylie by a single point, with three points deducted in the match against JS Kabylie in Tizi Ouzou and after the end of the first half JS Kabylie advanced with a single goal. USM Alger refused to complete the second half on the pretext of attacking the players of the team, including Billel Dziri, who said he was stabbed with a white weapon. it turned out that what looked like blood was nothing else Merbromin. During this period, the club signed several coaches including two foreigners René Lobello and Oscar Fulloné. and They did not achieve what was required of them. With the end of the 2009–10 season, the captain of the team Billel Dziri decided to put an end to his football career, which lasted more than 20 years, most of which were spent in USM Alger and his last match was against his former club NA Hussein Dey. And stated yes i confirm this because I have reached the age of 38 years and four months, which is the age that pushes me to retire because it is the right time for me, although i am sure that i can play for at least one or two more seasons.

References

External links

Official websites
Site officiel
USM Alger at FIFA

USM Alger
A